Protein AATF is a protein that in humans is encoded by the AATF gene.

Function 

The protein encoded by this gene was identified on the basis of its interaction with MAP3K12/DLK, a protein kinase known to be involved in the induction of cell apoptosis. This gene product contains a leucine zipper, which is a characteristic motif of transcription factors, and was shown to exhibit strong transactivation activity when fused to Gal4 DNA binding domain. Overexpression of this gene interfered with MAP3K12 induced apoptosis.

Interactions 

Apoptosis-antagonizing transcription factor has been shown to interact with:
 PAWR, 
 POLR2J,
 Retinoblastoma protein, and
 Sp1 transcription factor.

References

Further reading

External links 

   
 

Transcription factors